Stigmella tristis is a moth of the family Nepticulidae. It is endemic to Fennoscandia.

The wingspan is 4–5 mm.

The larvae feed on Betula nana. They mine the leaves of their host plant.

External links
Swedish Moths
Fauna Europaea

Nepticulidae
Moths of Europe
Moths described in 1862